Véronique Caprasse (born 20 November 1950 in Lüdenscheid, Germany) is a Belgian politician and a member of DéFI, a French-speaker interests party in and around the Brussels region. She was mayor of Kraainem from 2013 to 2015 and former member of the Belgian Federal Parliament. Caprasse was a member of the Chamber of Representatives from 2014 to 2019.

References

Living people
1950 births
DéFI politicians
Members of the Chamber of Representatives (Belgium)
Women mayors of places in Belgium
21st-century Belgian women politicians
21st-century Belgian politicians
People from Lüdenscheid
Kraainem